Jerome Storm (November 11, 1890 – July 10, 1958) was an American film director, actor, and writer. He acted in 48 films between 1914 and 1941 and directed 47 films between 1918 and 1932. He was born in Denver, Colorado, and died in Desert Hot Springs, California.

Selected filmography

 The Primal Lure (1916)
 Somewhere in France (1916)
 The Bride of Hate (1917)
 His Mother's Boy (1917)
 The Iced Bullet (1917)
 Keys of the Righteous (1918)
 The Family Skeleton (1918)
 The Biggest Show on Earth (1918)
 A Desert Wooing (1918)
 The Girl Dodger (1919)
 Greased Lightning (1919)
 The Busher (1919)
 Hay Foot, Straw Foot (1919)
 Bill Henry (1919)
 The Egg Crate Wallop (1919)
 Crooked Straight (1919)
 Red Hot Dollars (1919)
 Alarm Clock Andy (1920)
 Paris Green (1920)
 Homer Comes Home (1920)
 Arabian Love (1922)
 The Rosary (1922)
 Truxton King (1923)
 St. Elmo (1923)
 Madness of Youth (1923)
 Good-By Girls! (1923)
 The Siren of Seville (1924)
The Goldfish (1924)
 Some Pun'kins (1925)
 Along Came Auntie (1926)
 Sweet Adeline (1926)
 Ladies at Ease (1927)
 The Swift Shadow (1927)
 Dog Law (1928)
Law of Fear (1928)
 Dog Justice (1928)
 Fangs of the Wild (1928)
 Tracked (1928)
 Captain Careless (1928)
 Courtin' Wildcats (1929)
 The Racing Strain (1932)
 So This Is Africa (1933)
 Rainbow Ranch (1933)
 Diamond Trail (1933)

References

External links

1890 births
1958 deaths
American male film actors
American male screenwriters
Male actors from Colorado
People from Desert Hot Springs, California
Film directors from California
Screenwriters from California
20th-century American male actors
20th-century American male writers
20th-century American screenwriters